"Kon'ya Tsuki no Mieru Oka ni" (meaning 'At the Hill Where We Can See the Moon Tonight') is the twenty-seventh single by B'z, released on February 9, 2000. This song is one of B'z many number-one singles in Oricon chart, and sold over a millions copies, with 1,129,000 copies sold. It was used as the main theme for the TV drama Beautiful Life.

In 2011, the song was certified digitally by the RIAJ as a gold single for being downloaded more than 100,000 times to cellphones since its release as a digital download in early 2005.

Track listing

Personnel
 Tak Matsumoto - Electric guitar
 Koshi Inaba - Lead vocals
 Hideo Yamaki - Drums (on track 1)
 Kaichi Kurose - Drums (on track 2)
 Koji "Kitaroh" Nakamura - Bass (on track 1)
 Shoutarou Mitsuzono - Bass (on track 2)
 Onozuka Akira - Piano

Certifications

Notes

References 
B'z performance at Oricon

External links
B'z official website

2000 singles
B'z songs
Oricon Weekly number-one singles
Japanese television drama theme songs
Songs written by Tak Matsumoto
Songs written by Koshi Inaba
2000 songs